National Savings and Investments (NS&I), formerly called the Post Office Savings Bank and National Savings, is a state-owned savings bank in the United Kingdom. It is both a non-ministerial government department and an executive agency of HM Treasury. The aim of NS&I has been to attract funds from individual savers in the UK for the purpose of funding the government's deficit. NS&I attracts savers through offering savings products with tax-free elements on some products, and a 100% guarantee from HM Treasury on all deposits. As of 2017, approximately 9% of the government's debt is met by funds raised through NS&I, around half of which is from the Premium Bond offering.

History
National Savings and Investments was founded by the Palmerston government in 1861 as the Post Office Savings Bank, the world's first postal savings system. The aim of the bank was to allow ordinary workers a facility "to provide for themselves against adversity and ill-health", and to provide the government with access to debt funding. As an example, savings certificates were issued in the First and Second World Wars to help finance the war effort. On 1 June 1957, the Premium Bonds draws were inaugurated, using E.R.N.I.E. – the Electronic Random Number Indicator Equipment machine (now located in the Science Museum).

In 1969, the bank was transferred from the Post Office to the Treasury. Its name was changed to National Savings Bank, and it gained an independent legal identity under the National Savings Bank Act 1971. Despite its independence, it was used by Government in 1980 to fund a significant proportion of the public sector borrowing requirement. The then Director, Stuart Gilbert was given a target of £2 billion rising to £3.8 billion of the following three years to raise in National Savings - targets that were achieved.

The name was changed again in 2002 to National Savings and Investments.

The previous graphic identity of NS&I, including the NS&I logotype, was created in 2005 by Lloyd Northover, the British design consultancy founded by John Lloyd and Jim Northover. The identity was updated in 2020, however no public information has been released regarding this.

Role
In 2017, NS&I managed around £150 billion in savings. Funds from NS&I have historically been a relatively cheap source of government borrowing. NS&I sets interest rates both to attract savers and provide low-cost finance for the government, and 100% of any individual's savings are guaranteed by HM Treasury; rules are in place to ensure that it does not offer market-leading products that would stifle competition.

Operations
NS&I's head office is in Pimlico, London, with operational sites in Blackpool, Glasgow, Birkenhead and Durham. However, its entire back office operation is contracted out to a French company, Atos Global IT Solutions and Services, who use a site in Chennai, India.

NS&I first outsourced out its operations in 1999 to Siemens Business Services; some 4,000 staff were transferred to Siemens, leaving 130 NS&I staff responsible for the design, management and marketing of products, and managing the relationship with Siemens. A 2000 report by the National Audit Office stated that the contract was better value than keeping the operations in-house, and suggested other government departments could learn from the way this public-private partnership was procured and managed. The Siemens business unit was acquired by Atos in 2011.

In the past the bank offered many of its services through post offices, but in November 2011 it was announced that most products would only be available by telephone, online, or by post; Premium Bonds would be the only remaining product sold in post offices. From 1 August 2015, NS&I stopped selling Premium Bonds through post offices, and became a purely direct business.

Products
NS&I offers a wide range of savings and investment products, specialising in tax-free and income-generating products. As of December 2019 the following are offered:
 Premium Bonds
 Direct ISA
 Junior ISA
 Income Bonds
 Direct Saver Account
 Investment Account

Some further products are off-sale and only available for roll-over by maturing investments:
 Index-linked Savings Certificates
 Fixed Interest Savings Certificates
 Guaranteed Growth Bonds
 Guaranteed Income Bonds

Former products
Products which are no longer available with NS&I include:
 Children's Bonds
 Children's Bonus Bonds
 Investment Guaranteed Growth Bond
 TESSA-only ISA
 Fixed-Rate Savings Bonds
 Pensioners' Bonds and Capital Bonds
 Ordinary Account/Treasurer's Account/SAYE/Yearly Plan/Deposit Bonds
 FIRST Option Bonds
 National Savings Stamps and Gift Tokens
 Easy Access Savings Account

Gallery

See also

National Savings Movement
National Girobank
Rainbow Dance, Post Office Savings Bank film, 1936
Blythe House, London, headquarters 1903–1970s

References

External links

Banks established in 1861
Banks of the United Kingdom
Non-ministerial departments of the Government of the United Kingdom
Executive agencies of the United Kingdom government
1861 establishments in the United Kingdom
Government-owned companies of the United Kingdom
Postal savings system